Gary Buchanan (born June 30, 1980) is an American former professional basketball player. He played college basketball for Villanova University before starting a professional career. His jersey number was 22. Buchanan is from St. Louis, Missouri. In high school, he went to Valley Park. He played as a guard. In the 2010–11 season Buchanan played for BC Odessa.

References

External links 
Bio

1980 births
Living people
American expatriate basketball people in Argentina
American expatriate basketball people in Austria
American expatriate basketball people in the Netherlands
American expatriate basketball people in Ukraine
American men's basketball players
Basketball players from St. Louis
BC Odesa players
Donar (basketball club) players
Gimnasia y Esgrima de Comodoro Rivadavia basketball players
Shooting guards
Swans Gmunden players
Villanova Wildcats men's basketball players